Leotrim Kryeziu (born 25 January 1999) is a Kosovan professional footballer who plays as a centre-forward for Kosovan club Prishtina.

Club career

Lugano
On 23 August 2018, Kryeziu signed a four-year contract with Swiss Super League club Lugano. Two days later, he made his debut with Lugano, but with under-21 team in a league match against Ibach after being named in the starting line-up and scored his first two goals during a 0–2 away win. On 2 December 2018, Kryeziu made his debut with first team in a 2–2 home win against Neuchâtel Xamax after coming on as a substitute at 83rd minute in place of Mattia Bottani.

Loan at Chiasso
On 21 August 2019, Kryeziu joined Swiss Challenge League side Chiasso, on a season-long loan. One month later, he made his debut in a 3–0 away defeat against Stade Lausanne-Ouchy after being named in the starting line-up.

Prishtina

2020–21 season as loan
On 28 August 2020, Kryeziu joined Football Superleague of Kosovo side Prishtina, on a season-long loan and received squad number 9. On 19 September 2020, he made his debut in a 3–0 home win against Drenica after coming on as a substitute at 85th minute in place of Lorik Boshnjaku.

2021–22 season
On 1 July 2021, Kryeziu returned and signed a three-year contract with Football Superleague of Kosovo side Prishtina. Five days later, he made his debut with Prishtina in the 2021–22 UEFA Champions League first qualifying round against the Hungarian side Ferencváros after being named in the starting line-up.

International career

Under-19
On 1 October 2017, Kryeziu was named as part of the Kosovo U19 squad for 2018 UEFA European Under-19 Championship qualifications. On 3 October 2017, he made his debut with Kosovo U19 in a match against Austria U19 after being named in the starting line-up.

Senior
On 22 January 2018, Kryeziu received his first call-up from Kosovo for the friendly match against Azerbaijan. The match however was cancelled two days later, postponing his debut.

References

External links

1999 births
Living people
People from Kamenica, Kosovo
Kosovan footballers
Kosovo youth international footballers
Kosovan expatriate footballers
Kosovan expatriate sportspeople in Switzerland
Association football forwards
Football Superleague of Kosovo players
FC Drita players
FC Prishtina players
Swiss Super League players
2. Liga Interregional players
FC Lugano players
Swiss Challenge League players
FC Chiasso players